Marlon dos Santos Prazeres (born 29 April 1995), known as Marlon or Marlon Santos, is a Brazilian footballer who plays as a forward for Ironi Kiryat Shmona in the Israeli Premier League.

Career

Early career
Marlon joined Nova Iguaçu when he was nine years old, eventually making his way to the senior team.

In 2017, he joined Brazilian Serie D side Bangu.

For the 2018 season, he joined Botafogo PB.

Afterwards, he joined Madureira in May 2018.

FC Tulsa
On 13 August 2019, Marlon joined USL Championship side Tulsa Roughnecks FC. After joining Tulsa during a 16 game winless streak, Marlon helped contribute five goals and three assists in his nine appearances for the Roughnecks. On 22 November 2019, Tulsa announced they had re-signed Marlon to a multiyear deal at the club ahead of their upcoming 2020 season. He was named Tulsa's Offensive Player of the Year in 2021, with nine goals and three assists on the season, including two late goals in a match against Memphis 901 FC on 25 August 2021 in a 2–1 victory. He departed the club after the 2021 season, having scored 17 goals and adding eight assists over his 56 appearances in three seasons.

Birmingham Legion FC
Marlon signed with Birmingham Legion FC on 3 January 2022. He scored his first goal for Birmingham in their home opener against the Tampa Bay Rowdies on 13 March.

Hapoel Ironi Kiryat Shmona
On 5 January 2023, Marlon was transferred to Israeli Premier League side Hapoel Ironi Kiryat Shmona.

References

External links
 

1995 births
Living people
Brazilian footballers
Footballers from Rio de Janeiro (city)
Association football forwards
FC Tulsa players
USL Championship players
Nova Iguaçu Futebol Clube players
Bangu Atlético Clube players
Botafogo Futebol Clube (PB) players
Madureira Esporte Clube players
Birmingham Legion FC players
Brazilian expatriate footballers
Brazilian expatriate sportspeople in the United States
Expatriate soccer players in the United States
Hapoel Ironi Kiryat Shmona F.C. players
Expatriate footballers in Israel
Brazilian expatriate sportspeople in Israel